MediaMan is a general purpose collection organizer software for establishing a personal database of media collections (DVDs, CDs, books, etc.) developed by He Shiming.

Debuted in 2004 as freeware, MediaMan is the first software in its genre to create the concept of general purpose organizer, as people usually have to pay two licenses for a book organizer and a video organizer.

The license of MediaMan was freeware until late 2006, when the author decided to switch to shareware with a price of $39.95 for each license.

Amazon Web Services (later called E-Commerce Service and Product Advertising API) was used to retrieve product information automatically during the import process in MediaMan, which means it is also a part of the Amazon Associates program. However, the latest version of MediaMan (v3.10 series) no longer uses this API due to the efficiency guidelines introduced in October 2010.

MediaMan is also known as a Windows alternative to Mac OS X's Delicious Library.

Software development seems to have stalled with the last release of a beta of MediaMan 4.0 back in December 2013.  There have been a growing number of bugs in the software that has made the program unusable for some.  Communications with the developer have stopped, development and bug fixes have ceased, and the site has gone offline.

Product history

See also
Delicious Library

References

External links
 MediaMan
Neowin review
Softpedia review
Music By Mail Canada review

Windows multimedia software
Personal information manager software for Windows
Personal information managers